Daire O'Connor is an Irish professional footballer who plays as a winger for Scottish Championship club Ayr United.

Club career

UCD
A native of Arklow, County Wicklow, O'Connor began playing football with his local side Arklow Town and Dublin club Home Farm before joining the Under 19 side of UCD in August 2014. He made his first team debut for the club on 7 March 2015, the opening day of the 2015 League of Ireland First Division season, replacing Dylan Watts in the 89th minute of a 3–0 win over Cobh Ramblers at St Colman's Park. In February 2018, he scored a 93rd minute winner in the final of the Collingwood Cup against QUB. He was part of the side that won the 2018 League of Ireland First Division title, which was confirmed with a 1–1 draw against Finn Harps at the UCD Bowl on 14 September 2018. O'Connor was voted by his fellow League of Ireland First Division players into the PFAI First Division Team of the Year for 2018. He made a total of 86 appearances in all competitions during his 4 seasons at the club, scoring 12 goals. March 2019 saw O'Connor named Colleges and Universities Player of the Year at the FAI International Football Awards for his performances for University College Dublin's Collingwood Cup side.

Cork City
Deaspite leaving UCD at the end of the season, O'Connor still moved up to the League of Ireland Premier Division signing for Cork City ahead of the 2019 season. He made his Premier Division debut in the opening game of the season away to St Patrick's Athletic as his side lost 1–0 at Richmond Park but he did enough to impress the watching Republic of Ireland manager Mick McCarthy who said 'Daire O'Connor, he was the one player who stood out for me, he played very very well I thought. Whether it was on the right or on the left, he went and played in behind the striker. He was the one that stood out.' On 6 October 2020, it was announced that he had left the club, just 5 games before the end of the season after being told he was surplus to requirements by manager Neale Fenn. In the days the announcement, O'Connor revealed that he was 'baffled' at being told he was no longer required at the club following no falling out with his manager, stating 
'I didn't expect to go in Monday morning to training and not go back again.' He scored 5 goals in 47 appearances over his 2 seasons at the club.

Cliftonville
O'Connor signed for NIFL Premiership side Cliftonville on 21 October 2020 until the end of the season. In March 2021, Cliftonville manager Paddy McLaughlin called O'Connor 'unplayable' and backed him for a big future in the game. He scored 8 goals in 39 games for the club over the season.

Ayr United
On 28 July 2021, O'Connor signed for Scottish Championship side Ayr United. He made his debut for the club on 2 August 2021 in a 2–0 loss to Kilmarnock at Rugby Park. O'Connor scored his first goal for the club on 14 September 2021, opening the scoring in a 3–0 Scottish Challenge Cup win away to Rangers B.

Career statistics

Honours

Club
UCD
League of Ireland First Division: 2018
Collingwood Cup: 2018

Individual
PFAI First Division Team of the Year: 2018
FAI Colleges and Universities Player of the Year: 2018

References

Living people
1997 births
Association football midfielders
Association footballers from County Wicklow
Republic of Ireland association footballers
University College Dublin A.F.C. players
Cork City F.C. players
Cliftonville F.C. players
Ayr United F.C. players
League of Ireland players
NIFL Premiership players
Scottish Professional Football League players
Expatriate footballers in Scotland
Republic of Ireland expatriate association footballers
Republic of Ireland youth international footballers